CFTP may refer to:

 Configurable Fault Tolerant Processor
 Coupling from the past